12 gauge may refer to:

Size
12-gauge shotgun, the most popular shotgun shell
12 gauge sheet metal
12 gauge wire

Music 
 12 Gauge (Kalmah album), 2010 album by Finnish band Kalmah
 12 Gauge (rapper) (born 1968), American rapper active in the 1990s
 12 Gauge (12 Gauge album), 1994 album by the above artist
 Emerson Drive, a Canadian rock group known as 12 Gauge from 1995 to 2000 before moving to Nashville

Sports 
 Paige VanZant, MMA fighter, nicknamed "12 gauge".

See also
 Gauge (disambiguation)